Hundvåg is an island in Stavanger municipality in Rogaland county, Norway.  The island is located in the borough of Hundvåg, just north of the centre of the city of Stavanger, separated by the Byfjorden.  The  island is relatively flat and very urbanized.  There were 9803 residents of the island in 2014.  There are some agricultural areas as well as a lot of industry.  The small island of Buøy is connected to the south side of Hundvåg by a small man-made isthmus.  Hundvåg Church is located on the island.

Transportation
Hundvåg is connected to the mainland by a series of bridges connecting the islands of Buøy to Engøy to Sølyst to Grasholmen and then over the Stavanger City Bridge to the mainland of the city. The Hundvåg Tunnel goes under the sea and islands from the mainland of Stavanger to the northern part of Hundvåg island.

See also
List of islands of Norway

References

Islands of Stavanger